Days of Marigold is a silent short film directed by Mainak Misra. The film revolves around subject of cycle of dreams, reflections, hope, longing and nostalgia with a silhouette-like sepia tone. The film was shot at the banks of Pochampally village lake, located approximately 30 km away from Hyderabad, Telangana. The film has common people cast and not professional actors.

Plot 
The plot of the short starts with two brothers. The elder brothers leaves the village and the younger one always returns to the place they parted. On every return, a period of life is shown - from childhood till old age.

Awards and recognition 

 Official Selection, The Mediterranean Film Festival (MedFF), Sicily, Italy
 Official Selection, Move Me Productions Belgium-Film Festival, Antwerp, Belgium
 Official Selection, Yecora International Film Festival, Yecora, Mexico
 Official Selection, Art Quake Kyoto 2019 (Creativity Biennale of Art Exhibitions & Film Festival), Kyoto, Japan

References

External links 
 

Indian short films
Indian silent films
2017 short films